Sir Jonathan North College is an all-girls secondary school located in Leicester, England.

History
It was founded in 1904 by Rev. David Field, a wealthy land owner from Wigston. The current building was opened in 1937 and consisted of what is now known as the Macaulay building.  This was surrounded by playing fields most of which are now covered with new buildings - the old Latimer building was erected in the 1970s, the Wycliffe building was erected in 1996, the De Montfort Building was erected in 2004, the Knighton Tennis Centre was erected in 2008, and the new Latimer building was erected during the BSF period in 2014.  The school was awarded Specialist school status for visual arts (in 2001), science and mathematics (in 2005), and vocational learning (in 2006). In 2016 they were awarded the World Class Schools Mark by OFSTED.

Previously a community school administered by Leicester City Council, in March 2019 Sir Jonathan North College converted to academy status. The school is now sponsored by the Lionheart Academies Trust.

Divisions
There are five main blocks at the college; there is the Wycliffe block, where humanities and ICT are held, the Macaulay block where English and modern foreign languages are held, the Latimer block where Science and maths classes are held, the De Monfort block where Expressive Arts and Art classes are held and Hawkins -named after the suffragette, Alice Hawkins- where physical education is taught.

References

External links
Sir Jonathan North College official website

Secondary schools in Leicester
Girls' schools in Leicestershire
Academies in Leicester